John Sparey (1927–2010) was a cartoon animator and director. His first credit was Calvin and the Colonel. Sparey died on December 15, 2010.

External links

1927 births
2010 deaths
American animators
American animated film directors
American television directors